Since its organization in New York in 1830, The Church of Jesus Christ of Latter-day Saints (LDS Church) has had a presence in Canada. The church's first missionaries to preach outside of the United States preached in Upper Canada; the first stake to be established outside of the U.S. was the Alberta Stake; and the Cardston Alberta Temple was the first church temple built outside of the boundaries of the United States.

With the church reporting nearly 200,000 members at year-end 2021, Canada ranks as having the 4th largest body of members of the LDS Church in North America and the 12th worldwide.  The 2021 Canadian Census survey reported approximately 0.2% of the population (about 87,725 people) identified themselves as church members.

Early missionary contacts
In the winter of 1829–30, Oliver Cowdery and Hiram Page visited Upper Canada while seeking money to finance the publication of the Book of Mormon. After the publication of the Book of Mormon in March 1830, the unbaptized convert Phineas Young preached in Earnestown.

Joseph Smith and Don Carlos Smith—the first official Latter Day Saint missionaries to preach outside of the United States—visited Upper Canada in September 1830 and preached in villages north of the St. Lawrence River. In January 1832, converts Brigham and Phineas Young went to Upper Canada to convince their brother, Joseph to join the church. After Joseph's baptism, the Young brothers taught their family and friends in Canada and baptized over 150 individuals and established four branches of the church, including ones in Kingston and Sydenham.

Joseph Smith preached in Upper Canada in September 1833 with Sidney Rigdon and Freeman Nickerson. Also in 1833, future apostle, Lyman E. Johnson, preached in New Brunswick and Nova Scotia. Later, John E. Page and apostle Parley P. Pratt served successful missions to Upper Canada; Page baptized over 1,000 individuals between 1834 and 1836 and Pratt converted a number of individuals who would play a prominent role in the church, including John Taylor, Joseph and Mary Fielding, and William Law.

By 1850, approximately 2,500 residents of Canada—most of them from Upper Canada—had joined the LDS Church. However, most of these members joined the gathering of the Latter Day Saints in Kirtland, Ohio, Nauvoo, Illinois, and eventually Salt Lake City, Utah, and by 1861, the census of Ontario listed only 73 Mormons.

Colonization of Alberta
In 1887, John Taylor—who was then the church president—sent Charles Ora Card, president of the church's Cache Stake, to Canada's Northwest Territories to establish a LDS Church colony that was beyond the reach of the United States government's anti-polygamy prosecutions. Card led a group of followers and established a settlement along Lee's Creek; the settlement was eventually renamed Cardston in Card's honour. The church's Alberta Stake, the first outside of the United States, was created in 1895, with Card as its president.

Mormon pioneers continued to colonize what would become Alberta in 1905. Before the turn of the century, Latter-day Saints had founded Mountain View, Aetna, Beazer, Leavitt, Kimball, Caldwell, Taylorville, Magrath, and Stirling. After 1900, colonies of church members were established in Woolford, Welling, Orton, Raymond, Barnwell, Taber, Frankburg, Glenwood, and Hill Spring. Church apostle John W. Taylor—the son of church president John Taylor—played a leadership role in assisting Latter-day Saint emigration from Utah to Alberta.

The Alberta Stake was divided in two in 1903. The Alberta Stake remained headquartered in Cardston and the new Taylor Stake—named in honour of John W. Taylor—was headquartered in Raymond. By 1910, there were about 10,000 Latter-day Saints in southern Alberta and in 1913 the church began construction of a temple in Cardston. In 1924, church president Heber J. Grant dedicated the Cardston Alberta Temple, the church's first outside of the United States. A stake was organized in Lethbridge in 1921.

Stirling, one of Alberta's original Latter-day Saint settlements and a National Historic Site of Canada, was founded by Theodore Brandley in 1899, and is one of few towns in Canada plotted out by the Plat of Zion. Today, Stirling still follows the Plat of Zion; for this reason, the village is recognized as the most well-preserved Canadian example of the Latter-day Saint planning model.

Beyond Alberta and today
A branch of the church was organized in Edmonton in 1933, with the Edmonton Stake established in 1960. The Calgary Stake was established in 1953. In 1960, Alberta resident N. Eldon Tanner was called as a church general authority; he became a member of the Quorum of the Twelve Apostles in 1962 and a member of the First Presidency in 1963.

In 1998, a temple was announced for Edmonton and in December 1999 church president Gordon B. Hinckley dedicated the Edmonton Alberta Temple. In 2008, a temple was announced for Calgary by church president Thomas S. Monson.  The Calgary Alberta Temple was dedicated in October 2012.

As of December 31, 2021, the LDS Church reported 199,534 members, 53 stakes, 352 wards, 4 districts, 147 branches, 6 missions, 9 temples, and 152 Family History Centers in Canada.

In Canada, the church's Aid Fund donated C$185,000 to a newly rebuilt food bank in Medicine Hat, Alberta in February 2022. The money will help fund one commercial and two teaching kitchens in the Root Cellar Food and Wellness Hub.

In October 2022, the church's charitable practices attracted media coverage from the Canadian Broadcasting Corporation's The Fifth Estate, which reported that the Canadian LDS Church had funneled almost C$1 billion over the past 15 years into the LDS Church's US-based Brigham Young University, rather than supporting charitable activities in Canada. The majority of these funds came from tithing of church members who tithe ten percent of their income. Under Canadian tax law, the Canadian LDS Church qualifies for tax-free status as a charitable entity. Canadian charities are allowed to donate to foreign charities and universities on the condition that those institutions are registered as "qualified donees" with the Canadian Revenue Agency.

Geographical distribution 
Data from this section from Statistics Canada, 2021.

Provinces & territories

Missions

Temples
There are 9 temples operating in Canada.

Communities
Latter-day Saints have had a significant role in establishing and settling communities within the "Mormon Corridor" and other locations, including the following in Alberta, Canada:

Altorado
Barnwell
Bow Island
Cardston
Del Bonita
Ensign
Glenwood
Hill Spring
Jefferson
Kimball
Lundbreck
Magrath
Pincher Creek
Raley
Raymond
Seven Persons
Stirling
Taber
Welling
Woolford

See also

Edward J. Wood
Latter-day Saint settlements in Canada
Mormon Corridor
Mormon Trail (Canada)
The Church of Jesus Christ of Latter-day Saints membership statistics (Canada)
Fundamentalist Church of Jesus Christ of Latter-Day Saints
Mormon fundamentalism

References

Additional reading
 Richard E. Bennett, “Canada: From Struggling Seed, the Church Has Risen to Branching Maple,” Ensign, September 1988, p. 30.
 B. Y. Card (ed.) (1990). The Mormon Presence in Canada (Edmonton, Alta: University of Alberta Press) 
 Lethbridge Stake (1968). A History of the Mormon Church in Canada (Lethbridge, Alta.: Lethbridge Stake)
 Melvin S. Tagg (1963). A History of the Church of Jesus Christ of Latter-day Saints in Canada, 1830–1963 (Ph.D. dissertation, Brigham Young University)
.
.

External links
The Church of Jesus Christ of Latter-day Saints Official Canada site
The Church of Jesus Christ of Latter-day Saints Canada Newsroom site

 
Canada